Jane the Virgin (Spanish title: Juana la Virgen) is a 2002 Venezuelan telenovela written by Perla Farías and produced by RCTV. It was distributed worldwide by RCTV International.

Daniela Alvarado and Ricardo Álamo star as the protagonists. Roxana Díaz, Norkys Batista and Eduardo Serrano play the antagonists.

Synopsis 
Seventeen-year-old Juana Perez (Daniela Alvarado) is a bright student with a college scholarship to study journalism in the United States. During a routine medical checkup, she becomes pregnant by artificial insemination due to a hospital error. The father of the baby is discovered to be Mauricio de la Vega (Ricardo Álamo), the owner of Positivo fashion magazine. Years before, Mauricio suffered from a chronic illness and after recovering, he had his semen stored in order to fulfill his dreams of having a child with his wife, Carlota Vivas (Roxana Díaz). After learning of the hospital error, Mauricio tries to find the girl who could possibly be carrying his child and his only hope of becoming a father.

When her pregnancy is discovered and causes a scandal, Juana leaves school and finds a job as a photographer at Positivo. She begins to get close to Mauricio while working there, and he begins to fall in love with her, especially after discovering she is the mother of his child. Carlota's inability to give Mauricio a child and the possibility that Juana will take him away from her leads her to do everything possible to keep Mauricio and Juana separated.

Mauricio's business partner, Francisco Rojas (Saul Marin), disappears during Positivo magazine's party, leaving his wife Desirée alone and penniless.

Rogelio Vivas, Carlota's father who owns shares in Positivo, is secretly planning to take over the business from Mauricio and frame him for the death of Francisco. He becomes attracted to Desirée and tries to get close to her, much to the dismay of his wife Amparo. Desirée, who is friends with Carlota, stays at her house, and becomes infatuated with Mauricio.

Cast
Daniela Alvarado as Juana Pérez
Ricardo Álamo as Mauricio de la Vega
Roxana Díaz as Carlota Vivas de la Vega
Juan Carlos Alarcón as Manuel "Manolito" Ramón Pérez
Jonathan Montenegro as David
Marialejandra Martín as Ana María Pérez
Eduardo Serrano as Rogelio Vivas
Eliana Lopez as Enriqueta
Sebastián Falco as Martin
Leonardo Marrero as Alfredo Vivas
Manuel Salazar as Salvador
Miguel Ferrari as Armando
Flor Elena González as Amparo de Vivas
Freddy Galavis as Pablo "Popeye"
Aura Rivas as Azucena de Pérez
Norkys Batista as Desirée de Rojas
Verónica Cortés as La Bibi
Martín Brassesco as Humberto Vivas
Zhandra de Abreu as Kiara
Juliet Lima as Brandy Yuleisy
Laura Muñoz as Shiva
Gabriel López Medrano as Rafael
Miguel Ángel Sánz as Nicolás
Luis Gerardo Núñez as Alfonso
Saul Marín as Francisco Rojas

Adaptations 
In 2006, Ek Ladki Anjaani Si in India for Sony Entertainment Television.
 In 2010, Majka in Poland for TVN.
 In 2013, La virgen de la calle in Venezuela for RTI Producciones and Televisa.
 In 2014, Jane the Virgin in the United States for The CW.
In 2015 Turkish version of the series "Juana la Virgen" titled Hayat Mucizelere Gebe (Life Is Full of Miracles, in Turkish) produced by Med Yapım Kanal D and distributed by Sera Film Services
In 2015 Hayat Mucizelere Gebe in Turkey produced by Medyapim for Kanal D
 In 2017, Parthena Zoi Παρθένα Ζωή in Greece for ANT1.
 In 2019, "Bat-El Habetula" (Bat-El the Virgin, in Hebrew בתאל הבתולה) ":he:בת אל הבתולה", in Israel for Hot (Israel).
 In 2019 "Mariza la virigen"(Mariza the virigin,in Spanish Mariza la virigen),In spain and Latin America for Know channel Espana y Latin America, telefe, pol-ka, RCN Televisión, RTI Producciones, Telemundo, TV Azteca and Televisa.

References

External links

Opening Credits

2002 telenovelas
2002 Venezuelan television series debuts
2002 Venezuelan television series endings
Pregnancy-themed television shows
RCTV telenovelas
Venezuelan telenovelas
Spanish-language telenovelas
Television shows set in Caracas
Television shows remade overseas